Antle is an English surname. Notable people with this surname include:

 Bob Antle, cofounder of Tanimura & Antle
 Doc Antle (born 1960), American animal trainer
 Jim Antle, editor of The American Conservative
 Spencer Antle (born 1969), American fashion designer

See also
 ANTLE, Rolls-Royce Trent programme